Aureoboletus longicollis is a species of fungus in the family Boletaceae. First described under the name Boletus longicollis in 1879, it was transferred to the genus Boletellus in 1981 before being transferred to Aureoboletus in 2015.

References

Fungi described in 1879
Fungi of Asia
longicollis